These are the official results of the Women's Discus Throw event at the 1996 Summer Olympics in Atlanta, Georgia. There were a total number of 39 competitors, with the qualification round mark set at 62.00 metres.

Medalists

Results

Qualification
Qualification Rules: Qualifying performance 62.00 (Q) or at least 12 best performers (q) advance to the Final.

Final

See also
 1995 Women's World Championships Discus Throw
 1997 Women's World Championships Discus Throw

References

External links
 Official Report
 Results

D
Discus throw at the Olympics
1996 in women's athletics
Women's events at the 1996 Summer Olympics